Basil Feilding may refer to:

Basil Feilding, 2nd Earl of Denbigh (c. 1608–1675)
Basil Feilding, 4th Earl of Denbigh and 3rd Earl of Desmond (1668–1717)
Basil Feilding, 6th Earl of Denbigh and 5th Earl of Desmond (1719–1800)